Zimerman is a surname a variant of  "Zimmermann". Notable people with this surname include:

Notable people with the surname include:

 Krystian Zimerman (born 1956), Polish pianist
 Morris Zimerman (1911–1992), South African rugby union player

See also
 Zimmer, surname, variant of Zimerman
 Zimmerman (with double "m"), surname of which Zimerman is a variant
 Zimmermann, surname and a list of people with the name
 
 

German-language surnames